Central Lancashire can refer to:-

Central Lancashire - a former designated new town in England
Central Lancashire - a rugby league team which was based in Preston, England, and is now known as Blackpool Panthers
Lancashire Central (European Parliament constituency)
The University of Central Lancashire - based in Preston, England